Asada (written:  or ) is a Japanese surname. Notable people with the surname include:

, Japanese critic and curator
, Japanese footballer
, Japanese astronomer
, pen name of Kojirō Iwato (岩戸 康次郎), Japanese writer
, Japanese figure skater
, Japanese figure skater
, Japanese actress and singer
, Japanese darts player
, Japanese voice actress

Japanese-language surnames